Bisternalis is a genus of mites in the family Laelapidae.

Species
 Bisternalis camargoi Baker, Flechtmann & Delfinado-Baker, 1984     
 Bisternalis formosus Baker, Flechtmann & Delfinado-Baker, 1984     
 Bisternalis hunteri Baker, Delfinado-Baker & Reyes-Ordaz, 1983     
 Bisternalis mexicanus Baker, Delfinado-Baker & Reyes-Ordaz, 1983     
 Bisternalis rettenmeyeri Hunter, 1963     
 Bisternalis trigonarum Baker, Flechtmann & Delfinado-Baker, 1984

References

Laelapidae
Parasites of bees